Stephen John Cunis (born 17 January 1978) is a former New Zealand cricketer who played first-class and List A cricket for Canterbury between 1999 and 2006. He has since been a cricket coach and administrator.

Life and career
Stephen Cunis is the son of the New Zealand Test cricketer Bob Cunis. He grew up in Northland and attended Whangarei Boys' High School. After moving to Christchurch in 1998 he played and coached at the St Albans Cricket Club for 14 years.

A fast-medium bowler and useful lower-order batsman, he was a frequent member of the Canterbury team from 2000–01 to 2004–05. His best first-class bowling figures were 5 for 59 against Otago in 2000–01. His highest score was 64 not out against Wellington in 2003–04, when he and Chris Harris added an unbroken stand of 96 for the ninth wicket.  

He taught as a primary school teacher in Christchurch for 10 years. He coached extensively in Christchurch and was also the assistant coach of the New Zealand women's team. He and his family moved to Northland after the February 2011 earthquakes severely damaged his house and land. 

As of 2019 he works full-time for Northland Cricket Association as the General Manager. Before taking this position he had been the Northland coach for eight years. He and his wife Kara have three sons.

References

External links
 

1978 births
Living people
New Zealand cricketers
Canterbury cricketers
Sportspeople from Whakatāne
New Zealand cricket coaches
New Zealand cricket administrators